The Priyadarshini Jurala Project (PJP) or Jurala Project, is a dam on the Krishna River situated about 15 km from Gadwal, Jogulamba Gadwal district, Jurala Project is a dam on the Krishna River situated about 29 km from Atmakur, Wanaparthy district, Telangana, India.

History
The project was completed in 1995.

The Project
The Jurala has a full reservoir level of 1045 ft and has a full capacity of 11.94 TMC. As of August 2013, the project has an estimated capacity of 9.74 TMC.
The Jurala Project was completed in 1995

The power projects constructed and maintained by Telangana State Power Generation Corporation Ltd. 
The project was designed by Shri. SRIPATHI SRINIVAS REDDY

Statistics

 Minimum Draw Down Level (MDDL)(m) 314.86
 Nearest City : Gadwal, Telangana
 Gross Storage Capacity (MCM) 338.103189
 Live storage capacity (MCM) 192.27
 Design Flood (cumec) 35396.05
 Type of Spillway Ogee
 Length of Spillway (m) 927
 Type of Dam  Earthen + Masonry
 Type of Spillway Gates Radial
 Purpose of Dam Multi-Purpose, Irrigation, Hydroelectric
 Number of Spillway Gates 79
 Year of Completion 1996
 Size of Spillway Gates (m*m) 12M x 8.516M
 Catchment Area (Th ha) 12949.9
 Length of Dam (m) 4534
 Land affected- Culturable (Th ha) 04.6555112
 Maximum Height above foundation (m) 40
 Full Reservoir Level (m) 318.52

See also
 List of dams and reservoirs in India
 Nagarjuna Sagar tail pond

References

Dams in Telangana
Irrigation in Telangana
Mahbubnagar district
1995 establishments in Andhra Pradesh
Dams completed in 1995
20th-century architecture in India